The Newport–Inglewood Fault is a right-lateral strike-slip fault in Southern California. The fault can be inferred on the Earth's surface as passing along and through a line of hills extending from Signal Hill to Culver City. The fault has a slip rate of approximately /year and is predicted to be capable of a 6.0–7.4 magnitude earthquake on the moment magnitude scale. A 2017 study concluded that, together, the Newport–Inglewood Fault and Rose Canyon Fault could produce an earthquake of 7.3 or 7.4 magnitude.

The fault was first identified after a magnitude 4.9 earthquake struck near Inglewood, California on June 21, 1920. Due to the lack of earthquake-resistant construction in southern California at this time, this quake caused considerable damage in the Inglewood area and was a preview of what was to come almost 13 years later. The Long Beach earthquake occurred on March 10, 1933, centered along the southern segment of this fault, and registering a magnitude 6.4; this quake killed 115 people and was the second most deadly earthquake in California history, after the 1906 San Francisco earthquake.  Seventy schools in the Long Beach and Compton area were destroyed and an additional 120 were heavily damaged by the quake; had this tremor struck during school hours, the death toll would have been much higher, some estimates as high as 1000. In response to the poor performance of school structures, the California legislature passed the Field Act in April, mandating earthquake-resistant construction for all new school buildings.

The Newport–Inglewood Fault is part of the larger system of right-lateral strike-slip faults, most prominently the San Andreas Fault, which comprise the transform zone which separates the North American tectonic plate from the Pacific Plate. The irregular hills which occur along the fault trace are a result of deformation of the sedimentary rocks by the faulting; some of the earliest petroleum production in California tap reservoirs formed by the deformation.

References

Further reading

External links
 M6.8 Earthquake on the Newport Inglewood Fault (Huntington Beach) – Southern California Earthquake Center
 Newport–Inglewood Fault Zone – Southern California Earthquake Data Center
 Earthquake faults in the South Bay – Palos Verdes Fault
 Late Cenozoic Tectonics of Southern California
 Helium rising through the Newport–Inglewood fault zone
 
 Wilcox: Basic wrench tectonics

Seismic faults of California
Natural history of Los Angeles County, California
Natural history of Orange County, California